TV Eye Live 1977 (or TV Eye) is a live album by American musician Iggy Pop originally released in 1978. Iggy took a $90,000 advance from RCA Records to finish his contract with a live album. According to AllMusic, the album was assembled from soundboard tapes. Iggy Pop doctored them in a German studio, quickly and cheaply for around $5,000. The album features recordings from concerts on March 21 & 22, 1977 at The Agora in Cleveland, Ohio; on March 28, 1977 at The Aragon in Chicago, Illinois; and on October 26, 1977 at The Uptown Theater in Kansas City, Missouri.

The album is notable for the presence of David Bowie on keyboards and background vocals for selected tracks and the rather crushing bass and drum sound; also, with the Sales brothers, the lineup prefigures in part Bowie's Tin Machine lineup.

Track listing
 "T.V. Eye" (Iggy Pop, Ron Asheton)
 "Funtime" (Iggy Pop, David Bowie)
 "Sixteen" (Iggy Pop)
 "I Got a Right" (Iggy Pop)
 "Lust for Life" (Iggy Pop, David Bowie)
 "Dirt" (Iggy Pop)
 "Nightclubbing" (Iggy Pop, David Bowie)
 "I Wanna Be Your Dog" (Iggy Pop, Ron Asheton)

Charts

Personnel
 Iggy Pop – vocals
 David Bowie – piano and synthesizers (on tracks 1, 2, 6 & 8)
 Ricky Gardiner – guitar (on tracks 1, 2, 6 & 8)
 Stacey Heydon – guitar (on tracks 3, 4, 5 & 7)
 Scott Thurston – guitar, piano, harmonica, synthesizer (on tracks 3, 4, 5 & 7)
 Tony Sales – bass
 Hunt Sales – drums
Technical
 Eduard Meyer – engineer
 Barney Wan – art direction
 Jan Michael Alejandro – tech, road crew
 Vern "Moose" Constan – tech, road crew
 Robert Joyce – tech, road crew

References

Iggy Pop live albums
Albums produced by David Bowie
1978 live albums
RCA Records live albums